Gigantochloa is a tropical Asian and Papuasian genus of giant clumping bamboos in the grass family. It is found in southern China, Southeast Asia, the Indian subcontinent, and New Guinea.

Species

Formerly included
see Bambusa Dendrocalamus Neololeba Pseudoxytenanthera

References

Bambusoideae
Bambusoideae genera